
Gmina Bestwina is a rural gmina (administrative district) in Bielsko County, Silesian Voivodeship, in southern Poland.

Villages
Gmina Bestwina contains the villages and settlements of Bestwina, Bestwinka, Janowice and Kaniów.

Neighbouring gminas
Gmina Bestwina is bordered by the city of Bielsko-Biała and by the gminas of Czechowice-Dziedzice, Miedźna, Pszczyna and Wilamowice.

References

Bestwina
Bielsko County